Sandoval is a habitational surname of Spanish origin. It primarily originates from Sandoval de la Reina, Spain, earlier called Sannoval, which is a blend word of Latin saltus (meaning 'grove' or 'wood') and Latin novalis (meaning 'newly cleared land').

People with the surname 

 Aarón Sandoval, Mexican footballer
 Andrew Sandoval, American songwriter, musician, producer and author
 Angelina Sandoval-Gutierrez (born 1938), Filipino jurist  
 Arturo Sandoval, Cuban Latin-jazz musician
 Brian Sandoval (born 1963), American politician, Republican governor of Nevada
 Carla Sandoval (born 1982), Chilean pianist
 Carlos Sandoval (born 1956), Mexican-German composer, musician and sound artist
 Carlos Ramírez Sandoval (1939–2016), Mexican museum director and curator
 Carmen Barajas Sandoval (1925–2014), Mexican aristocrat, film executive producer, bestselling author
 Cristóbal de Sandoval, Duke of Uceda (1581–1624), minister of state for Philip III of Spain
 Danny Sandoval (born 1979), Venezuelan baseball infielder
 Diego de Sandoval (1505–1580), Spanish explorer and conquistador
 Dominic Sandoval, American dancer and YouTube personality
 Elman Joel Sandoval, Honduran politician
 Esther Sandoval (1927–2006), Puerto Rican actress
 Eva Contreras Sandoval (born 1956), Mexican politician
 Federico Sandoval II, known as Ricky Sandoval, Filipino congressman
 Francisco de Sandoval Acacitzin (died 1554), native ruler of Itzcahuacan in Mexico after the Spanish conquest
 Francisco Gómez de Sandoval, 1st Duke of Lerma (1552/53–1625), a favorite of Philip III of Spain
 Freddy Sandoval (born 1982), Mexican baseball player
 Fulvia Celica Siguas Sandoval, Peruvian transsexual woman
 Gerardo Sandoval (born 1962), judge of the Superior Court of California
 Gidget Sandoval, Costa Rican Miss International for 1983
 Gonzalo de Sandoval (1497–1528), Spanish conquistador in New Spain
 Hernán Sandoval (born 1983), Guatemalan football striker
 Horacio Sandoval (born 1971), Mexican comic book artist
 Hope Sandoval, American singer-songwriter
 Irma Sandoval Ballesteros, Mexican academic
 Isabel Sandoval, Filipina filmmaker and actress
 Jery Sandoval (born 1986), Colombian actress, model and singer
 Jesse Sandoval, American drummer, formerly of The Shins
 José León Sandoval, President of Nicaragua from 1845–47
 Juan Sandoval Íñiguez (born 1933), Roman Catholic cardinal and archbishop, from Mexico
 Julio Terrazas Sandoval (1936–2015), Roman Catholic cardinal and archbishop, from Bolivia
 Kevin Sandoval (Guatemalan footballer) (born 1962), Guatemalan footballer
 Kevin Sandoval (Peruvian footballer) (born 1997), Peruvian footballer
 Luciana Sandoval (born 1980), Salvadoran television presenter, dancer and model
 Luis Sandoval (disambiguation)
 Manuel de Sandoval, Neomexican soldier, governor of Coahuila (1729–1733) and Texas
 Marlene Sandoval, known as Rubí Sandoval, Mexican footballer
 Martin Sandoval (1964–2020), American politician; Democratic member of the Illinois Senate
 Merril Sandoval (1925–2008), American Navajo World War II veteran
 Miguel Sandoval (born 1951), American film and television actor
 Miguel Sandoval (composer) (1903–1953), Guatemalan film composer
 Pablo Sandoval, Venezuelan professional baseball player
 Patrick Sandoval (born 1996), American professional baseball player
 Pete Sandoval, Salvadoran-born American drummer of the band Morbid Angel
 Raúl Sandoval, Mexican actor and singer
 Richie Sandoval (born 1960), American boxer
 Roberto Parra Sandoval (1921–1995), Chilean singer-songwriter, guitarist and folklorist
 Samy and Sandra Sandoval, Panamanian musical duo
 Santiago Cristóbal Sandoval, Mexican sculptor
 Shaina Sandoval (born 1992), American actress
 Sonny Sandoval, American lead singer of the band P.O.D.
 Teresita Sandoval (1811–1894) a founder of Pueblo, Colorado
 Tony Sandoval (born 1954), American marathon runner
 Valeska Sandoval, Nicaraguan student
 Vicente Cerna Sandoval, president of Guatemala 1865–71
 Wellington Sandoval, Ecuadorian surgeon and former politician

Fictional characters 
 Tom Sandoval, cartoon clown from Vanderpump Rules

See also
 Senator Sandoval (disambiguation)

References

Spanish-language surnames
Sephardic surnames
Jewish surnames